Hanke Gerdina Johannette Bruins Slot (born 20 October 1977) is a Dutch politician, jurist and army officer who has served as Minister of the Interior and Kingdom Relations since 10 January 2022 in the Fourth Rutte cabinet. A member of the Christian Democratic Appeal (CDA), she previously served in the House of Representatives from 2010 to 2019. Bruins Slot focused her work as a parliamentarian on matters of defence personnel, local government, healthcare science, medical law, psychiatry and sports.

From 2019 to 2022, she was a member of the provincial executive of Utrecht, in which she was in charge of nature, agriculture, soil and water, sport and governance. Prior to her political career, she served in the Royal Netherlands Army; she was deployed to Uruzgan Province, Afghanistan. In 2010, she was conferred the rank of artillery captain.

References

External links 
  House of Representatives biography
  Parlement.com biography

1977 births
Living people
Christian Democratic Appeal politicians
Dutch female field hockey players
Dutch women jurists
Dutch female military personnel
Dutch military personnel of the War in Afghanistan (2001–2021)
Female interior ministers
Graduates of the Koninklijke Militaire Academie
Lesbian military personnel
Lesbian politicians
LGBT cabinet members of the Netherlands
LGBT Calvinist and Reformed Christians
LGBT conservatism
LGBT members of the Parliament of the Netherlands
Members of the House of Representatives (Netherlands)
Ministers of the Interior of the Netherlands
Ministers of Kingdom Relations of the Netherlands
Protestant Church Christians from the Netherlands
People from Apeldoorn
Royal Netherlands Army officers
Utrecht University alumni
Women government ministers of the Netherlands
21st-century Dutch civil servants
21st-century Dutch jurists
21st-century Dutch women politicians